Southernmost settlements are cities, towns, weather stations or permanent military bases which are farther south than latitude 45°S. They are closely related to the Southern Ocean or either the Roaring Forties or Furious Fifties. Antarctic bases are excluded due to not having a permanent population.

Southernmost city
The southernmost city in the world is mainly a slogan used for tourism to attract visitors to a city as well as the tourists headed for Antarctica. Ciudad (city) is not a legal designation in Chile and Argentina, except for the Autonomous City of Buenos Aires. Currently three places use this slogan: Ushuaia in Argentina as well as Punta Arenas and Puerto Williams in Chile, with the last being the absolute southernmost town by latitude (see table below). There are several more settlements further south but none are considered to be large enough to be classified as a 'city'. The three contending cities are from north to south:

Punta Arenas (population: 130,136), literally in Spanish: "Sandy Point", is the oldest and largest city in Southern Patagonia, at the Strait of Magellan and the capital of the Magallanes and Antártica Chilena Region. It is the largest of the three contenders with around 130,000 permanent residents and it is called the southernmost city by some media outlets. The basis of its claim to be the southernmost city rests on it being larger than Ushuaia, Río Grande, and Puerto Williams, all of which are farther south.
Ushuaia (population: 71,000), the capital of the Argentine province of Tierra del Fuego, is more commonly regarded as the southernmost city in the world due to its large population, 71,000, its infrastructure and its accepted classification as a city. Ushuaia is located in a wide bay on the southern coast of the island of Tierra del Fuego, on the northern shore of the Beagle Channel; hence, it is further north than Puerto Williams.

Puerto Williams (population: 2,874) located on Isla Navarino,  is the southernmost town in the world on the southern shore of the Beagle Channel. It is the capital of the Antártica Chilena Province, one of four provinces located in the Magallanes and Antártica Chilena Region. Puerto Williams is sometimes considered the southernmost city in the world by Chilean media and some large media international organisations, although it promotes itself with the slogan Puerto Williams, the southernmost town in the world in its tourism campaigns. It has a Naval Hospital of Puerto Williams, the Martin Gusinde Anthropological Museum, the Guardiamarina Zañartu Airport and a university campus and it is a naval base of the Chilean Navy.

Settlements of more than 1,000 inhabitants south of 45°S

This is a list of all settlements south of the 45th parallel south with over 1,000 permanent inhabitants.

Southernmost settlements outside Antarctica
This list of settlements excludes research stations in Antarctica and its surrounding islands.

The former Argentine base Corbeta Uruguay (59°28′ S) in South Sandwich Islands was the southernmost settlement outside Antarctica from 1976–1982.

Settlements on the Antarctic continent

There are many research stations in Antarctica, both permanent and summer only. Many of the stations are staffed all year. McMurdo Station is the largest with an average population of 1200.

A total of 30 countries (as of October 2006), all signatory to the Antarctic Treaty, operate seasonal (summer) or year-round research stations on the continent and on its surrounding islands. In addition to these permanent stations, approximately 30 field camps are established each austral summer to support specific one off projects.

The full list is available at:
Research stations in Antarctica.

See also
 Extreme points of Earth
 List of southernmost items
 Northernmost cities and towns
 Northernmost settlements

References

Extreme points of Earth
Geography of the Southern Ocean
Geography of Antarctica
 
 
Southernmost

Bibliography
 L. Ivanov and N. Ivanova. Southernmost city. In: The World of Antarctica. Generis Publishing, 2022. pp. 126-130.